Binta Diarra (born 15 December 1994) is a Malian footballer who plays for AS Real De Bamako and the Mali national team.

She played for Mali at the 2016 Africa Women Cup of Nations, scoring for Mali in the match against Ghana.

References

1994 births
Living people
Malian women's footballers
Mali women's international footballers
Women's association football midfielders
21st-century Malian people